Booker is both a surname and a given name. Notable people with the name include:

Surname
 Charles Booker (American politician), (born 1984) member of the Kentucky House of Representatives
 Charles Booker (Australian politician) (1865-1925), member of the Queensland Legislative Assembly
 Charles Dawson Booker (1897–1918), English World War I ace fighter pilot
 Charles Goodenough Booker (1859–1926), Canadian politician, mayor of Hamilton, Ontario
 Chris Booker (born 1971), American radio and television personality
 Chris Booker (baseball) (born 1976), American former Major League Baseball pitcher
 Chris Booker (basketball) (born 1981), American former basketball player
 Christopher Booker (1937–2019), English journalist and author
 Cory Booker (born 1969), American politician, U.S. Senator from New Jersey and former mayor of Newark, New Jersey
 Devin Booker (basketball, born 1991), American basketball player
 Devin Booker (born 1996), American basketball player in the NBA
 Devontae Booker (born 1991), American football player
 Eddie Booker (1917–1975), American boxer
 Eric Booker (born c. 1969), American hip-hop artist and competitive eater
 Eric Booker (golfer)  (born 1963), American professional golfer
 George Booker (1821-1883) of Virginia, American politician, lawyer, teacher, judge
 Hassan Booker (born 1975), American basketball player and coach
 James Booker (1939–1983), American pianist and singer
 Kenny Booker (born c. 1948), American basketball player
 Lorenzo Booker (born 1984), American football running back
 Marty Booker (born 1976), American football wide receiver
 Peter Jeffrey Booker (born 1924), British engineer and technological-drawing historian
 Rod Booker (born 1958), American professional baseball player
 Squire Booker  (born 1965), American biochemist
 Thomas Booker (born 1999), American football player
 Trevor Booker (born 1987), American basketball player
 Trevor Booker (footballer) (born 1969), English former footballer

Given name
 Booker Brown (born 1952), American football offensive tackle
 Booker T. (wrestler) (born 1965), American professional wrestler
Booker Ervin (1930–1970), American jazz tenor saxophone player
 Booker T. Jones (born 1944), American multi-instrumentalist, songwriter, record producer and arranger
 Booker Little (1938–1961), American jazz trumpet player
 Booker T. Washington (1856–1915), American educator, author, orator, and advisor

See also
 Booker T (disambiguation)